The 1998 USC Trojans baseball team represented the University of Southern California in the 1998 NCAA Division I baseball season. The team was coached Mike Gillespie in his 12th season.

The Trojans won the College World Series, defeating the Arizona State Sun Devils in the championship game.

Roster

Schedule 

! style="background:#FFCC00;color:#990000;"| Regular Season
|- 

|- align="center" bgcolor="ddffdd"
| January 30 ||  || 16–4 || 1–0 || –
|- align="center" bgcolor="ddffdd"
| February 1 || Long Beach State || 9–5 || 2–0 || –
|- align="center" bgcolor="ddffdd"
| February 7 ||  || 5–3 || 3–0 || –
|- align="center" bgcolor="ffdddd"
| February 7 || Texas || 5–6 || 3–1 || –
|- align="center" bgcolor="ffdddd"
| February 8 || Texas || 7–15 || 3–2 || –
|- align="center" bgcolor="ddffdd"
| February 10 || at Long Beach State || 12–3 || 4–2 || –
|- align="center" bgcolor="ddffdd"
| February 13 || vs.  || 10–0 || 5–2 || –
|- align="center" bgcolor="ddffdd"
| February 14 || vs. North Carolina || 16–9 || 6–2 || –
|- align="center" bgcolor="ddffdd"
| February 15 || vs. North Carolina || 10–2 || 7–2 || –
|- align="center" bgcolor="ddffdd"
| February 18 || at  || 3–2 || 8–2 || –
|- align="center" bgcolor="ddffdd"
| February 20 || vs.  || 10–3 || 9–2 || 1–0
|- align="center" bgcolor="ddffdd"
| February 21 || vs. Arizona || 4–1 || 10–2 || 2–0
|- align="center" bgcolor="ffdddd"
| February 22 || vs. Arizona || 2–3 || 10–3 || 2–1
|- align="center" bgcolor="ddffdd"
| February 25 || at  || 5–2 || 11–3 || –
|- align="center" bgcolor="#ddffdd"
| February 27 ||  || 6–1 || 12–3 || 3–1
|- align="center" bgcolor="#ddffdd"
| February 28 || UCLA || 10–9 || 13–3 || 4–1
|-

|- align="center" bgcolor="#ffdddd"
| March 1 || UCLA || 7–12 || 13–4 || 4–2
|- align="center" bgcolor="#ddffdd"
| March 3 ||  || 15–8 || 14–4 || –
|- align="center" bgcolor="#ddffdd"
| March 6 ||  || 9–0 || 15–4 || –
|- align="center" bgcolor="#ddffdd"
| March 7 || Oregon State || 7–4 || 16–4 || –
|- align="center" bgcolor="#ffdddd"
| March 8 || Oregon State || 6–13 || 16–5 || –
|- align="center" bgcolor="ddffdd"
| March 14 || Arizona State || 7–6 || 17–5 || 5–2
|- align="center" bgcolor="ddffdd"
| March 14 || Arizona State || 13–5 || 18–5 || 6–2
|- align="center" bgcolor="ddffdd"
| March 15 || Arizona State || 6–3 || 19–5 || 7–2
|- align="center" bgcolor="ddffdd"
| March 17 ||  || 6–4 || 20–5 || –
|- align="center" bgcolor="ddffdd"
| March 20 || at Arizona || 6–4 || 21–5 || 8–2
|- align="center" bgcolor="ddffdd"
| March 21 || at Arizona || 7–6 || 22–5 || 9–2
|- align="center" bgcolor="ddffdd"
| March 22 || at Arizona || 10–6 || 23–5 || 10–2
|- align="center" bgcolor="ddffdd"
| March 24 || Pepperdine || 11–1 || 24–5 || –
|- align="center" bgcolor="ddffdd"
| March 27 || at  || 10–6 || 25–5 || 11–2
|- align="center" bgcolor="ddffdd"
| March 28 || at California || 7–6 || 26–5 || 12–2
|- align="center" bgcolor="ddffdd"
| March 29 || at California || 8–1 || 27–5 || 13–2
|-

|- align="center" bgcolor="ffdddd"
| April 1 || Cal State Fullerton || 4–7 || 27–6 || –
|- align="center" bgcolor="ffdddd"
| April 3 ||  || 0–1 || 27–7 || 13–3
|- align="center" bgcolor="ffdddd"
| April 5 || Stanford || 6–7 || 27–8 || 13–4
|- align="center" bgcolor="ddffdd"
| April 5 || Stanford || 7–4 || 28–8 || 14–4
|- align="center" bgcolor="ddffdd"
| April 6 ||  || 12–3 || 29–8 || –
|- align="center" bgcolor="ffdddd"
| April 9 || at Arizona State || 3–18 || 29–9 || 14–5
|- align="center" bgcolor="ffdddd"
| April 10 || at Arizona State || 5–7 || 29–10 || 14–6
|- align="center" bgcolor="ffdddd"
| April 11 || at Arizona State || 4–24 || 29–11 || 14–7
|- align="center" bgcolor="ffdddd"
| April 14 || at Loyola Marymount || 6–12 || 29–12 || –
|- align="center" bgcolor="ddffdd"
| April 17 || California || 10–0 || 30–12 || 15–7
|- align="center" bgcolor="ddffdd"
| April 18 || California || 14–13 || 31–12 || 16–7
|- align="center" bgcolor="ddffdd"
| April 19 || California || 5–2 || 32–12 || 17–7
|- align="center" bgcolor="ddffdd"
| April 21 || at  || 9–4 || 33–12 || –
|- align="center" bgcolor="ddffdd"
| April 24 || at UCLA || 14–6 || 34–12 || 18–7
|- align="center" bgcolor="ffdddd"
| April 25 || UCLA || 17–18 || 34–13 || 18–8
|- align="center" bgcolor="ffdddd"
| April 26 || at UCLA || 17–12 || 35–13 || 19–8
|- align="center" bgcolor="ddffdd"
| April 28 || San Diego State || 17–10 || 36–13 || – 
|- align="center" bgcolor="ddffdd"
| April 29 || UC Santa Barbara || 9–8 || 37–13 || –
|-

|- align="center" bgcolor="ffdddd"
| May 9 || at Stanford || 2–4 || 37–14 || 19–9
|- align="center" bgcolor="ddffdd"
| May 10 || at Stanford || 5–2 || 38–14 || 20–9
|- align="center" bgcolor="ddffdd"
| May 11 || at Stanford || 5–1 || 39–14 || 21–9
|- align="center" bgcolor="ddffdd"
| May 15 || at  || 10–2 || 40–14 || –
|- align="center" bgcolor="ffdddd"
| May 15 || at Portland State || 6–7 || 40–15 || –
|-

|-
! style="background:#FFCC00;color:#990000;"| Post–Season
|-

|- align="center" bgcolor="ddffdd"
| May 21 || vs.  || Tiger Field || 10–6 || 41–15
|- align="center" bgcolor="ffdddd"
| May 22 || vs.  || Tiger Field || 4–14 || 41–16
|- align="center" bgcolor="ddffdd"
| May 23 || vs. Clemson || Tiger Field || 8–5 || 42–16
|- align="center" bgcolor="ddffdd"
| May 23 || vs.  || Tiger Field || 3–2 || 43–16
|- align="center" bgcolor="ddffdd"
| May 24 || vs. South Alabama || Tiger Field || 4–3 || 44–16
|-

|- align="center" bgcolor="ffdddd"
| May 30 || vs.  || Rosenblatt Stadium || 10–12 || 44–17
|- align="center" bgcolor="ddffdd"
| June 1 || vs. Florida || Rosenblatt Stadium || 12–10 || 45–17
|- align="center" bgcolor="ddffdd"
| June 2 || vs.  || Rosenblatt Stadium || 7–1 || 46–17
|- align="center" bgcolor="ddffdd"
| June 4 || vs. LSU || Rosenblatt Stadium || 5–4 || 47–17
|- align="center" bgcolor="ddffdd"
| June 5 || vs. LSU || Rosenblatt Stadium || 7–3 || 48–17
|- align="center" bgcolor="ddffdd"
| June 6 || vs. Arizona State || Rosenblatt Stadium || 21–14 || 49–17
|-

Awards and honors 
Rik Currier
 Freshman All-America

Seth Davidson
 Freshman All-America
 All-Pac-10 First Team

Morgan Ensberg
 All-America Third Team
 All-Pac-10 First Team

Seth Etherton
 The Sporting News Player of the Year
 All-America First Team
 Pac-10 Pitcher of the Year
 All-Pac-10 First Team

Jeremy Freitas
 All-Pac-10 Honorable Mention

Rob Gorr
 College World Series All-Tournament Team
 All-Pac-10 First Team

Jack Krawczyk
 College World Series All-Tournament Team
 All-America First Team
 All-Pac-10 First Team

Jason Lane
 College World Series All-Tournament Team

Eric Munson
 College World Series All-Tournament Team
 All-America Second Team
 All-Pac-10 Honorable Mention

Wes Rachels
 College World Series Most Outstanding Player
 All-Pac-10 Honorable Mention

Brad Ticehurst
 College World Series All-Tournament Team
 All-Pac-10 Honorable Mention

Trojans in the 1998 MLB Draft 
The following members of the USC baseball program were drafted in the 1998 Major League Baseball Draft.

See also 
 USC Trojans baseball

References

External links 
 USC Trojans baseball official website 

USC Trojans baseball seasons
Usc
College World Series seasons
NCAA Division I Baseball Championship seasons
USC Trojans
Southern California